Dioptis beckeri is a moth of the family Notodontidae first described by James S. Miller in 2008. It is found in Rondônia in Brazil.

The length of the forewings is 15.5–18 mm for males and 19–20 mm for females. The ground color of the forewings is hyaline (glass like), with dark brown veins as they pass through hyaline areas. The hindwings are hyaline, also with dark brown veins in the hyaline area.

Etymology
The species is named in honor of Vitor Osmar Becker.

References

Moths described in 2008
Notodontidae of South America